Clayton de Sousa Moreira (born 24 February 1988) is a Luxembourgian footballer who plays as a right back for Jeunesse Esch in the Luxembourg National Division, and formerly the Luxembourg national football team.

Club career

Jeunesse Esch
In 2004, he signed for Luxembourg National Division outfit Jeunesse Esch. He has since been an integral part of the first making many appearances in both league and continental competitions.

International career
On 27 May 2006 he made his debut for the Luxembourg national football team in a friendly match against Germany.

References 

1988 births
Living people
Luxembourgian people of Cape Verdean descent
Luxembourgian footballers
Luxembourg National Division players
Jeunesse Esch players
F91 Dudelange players
Luxembourg international footballers
Association football fullbacks